Zuidoost United is a Dutch amateur  football (soccer) club from the Amsterdam borough of Zuidoost, founded in 2010. The club hold both a Saturday and a Sunday team, competing in sections of the Vierde Klasse league.

History
In 2010 the club Zuidoost United was initiated on July 1, out of a merger from preexisting SV Bijlmer, KSJB and Kismet ’82, all amateur football clubs from the same area. The resulting combination had some 500 members as of June 2013, when it expelled some 200 members for not paying dues. The club has two teams, which compete in the Vierde Klasse, for both Saturday and Sunday league play. They also host an indoor Futsal team, as well as complete youth system.

Stadium
Zuidoost United compete in the Bijlmer Sportpark, in the Bijlmer neighborhood of Southeast-Amsterdam.

References

External links 
 Zuidoost United Official website

Football clubs in the Netherlands
Association football clubs established in 2010
Football clubs in Amsterdam
2010 establishments in the Netherlands